Störmecke is a locality in the municipality Schmallenberg in the district Hochsauerlandkreis in North Rhine-Westphalia, Germany.

The hamlet has 4 inhabitants and located almost seven kilometres southeast of the Schmallenberg city centre. Störmecke borders on the villages of Latrop, Schanze, Grafschaft and Kühhude.

References

Villages in North Rhine-Westphalia
Schmallenberg